The Dancers is a 1930 American pre-Code melodrama, produced and distributed by Fox Film Corporation, and directed by Chandler Sprague. It is based on a 1923 West End play of the same title by Viola Tree and Gerald du Maurier. The film marks the feature sound film debut of actress Mrs. Patrick Campbell. The setting was shifted from the play's South America to Canada.

Cast
Lois Moran - Diana
Phillips Holmes - Tony
Walter Byron - Berwin
Mae Clarke - Maxine
Tyrell Davis - Archie
Mrs. Patrick Campbell - Aunt Emily

References

External links
The Dancers @ IMDb.com

1930 films
American films based on plays
Fox Film films
Films scored by Hugo Friedhofer
Films set in London
Films set in Canada
1930 drama films
American drama films
Melodrama films
1930s English-language films
1930s American films